Kosterhavet National Park (literally The Koster Sea National Park) is the first national marine park in Sweden, inaugurated in September 2009. It is part of the Skagerrak sea and is located in Strömstad and Tanum municipalities in Bohuslän, Västra Götaland County, Sweden. It consists of the sea and shores around the Koster Islands, excluding everything else on the islands. In the north, it borders the Norwegian marine park of Ytre Hvaler.

Kosterhavet National Park is home to Sweden's largest seal colony.

Nature 

The environment in the park is unique to Swedish waters. Over 6,000 marine species have been identified, about 200 of them can not to be found elsewhere in Sweden. Brachiopod, sponge and coral larvae are brought in by currents from the Atlantic. Rare seabirds, such as Arctic terns and skuas, along with a large population of harbor seals have their habitat here. Plaice, cod and sea trout breed in the more shallow waters closer to the shore.

Professional fishing is allowed although special regulations apply. The waters of the park is significant for the fishing of northern prawn and Norwegian lobster. Fishing is not subject to environmental protection, and are instead regulated by fishery laws and an agreement from 2000.

Gallery

References

External links 

Kosterhavets webbplats 
Sweden's National Parks: Kosterhavet National Park from the Swedish Environmental Protection Agency

Protected areas established in 2009
2009 in Sweden
Bohuslän
National parks of Sweden
Geography of Västra Götaland County
Marine parks
Tourist attractions in Västra Götaland County
Skagerrak